RCYC may refer to:
Royal Canadian Yacht Club, Toronto 
 Royal Cape Yacht Club, Cape Town, South Africa
Royal Clyde Yacht Club, Scotland 
 Royal Corinthian Yacht Club, Essex, England 
Royal Cork Yacht Club, Ireland, possibly the world's oldest yacht club
 Royal Cornwall Yacht Club, Falmouth, England